Xhelil Asani (or Djelil Asani; born 12 September 1995) is a Macedonian professional footballer of ethnic Albanian origin who plays for Premier League BH club Rudar Prijedor.

References

External links

 (post-2021)

1995 births
Living people
People from Kičevo
Albanian footballers from North Macedonia
Association football midfielders
Macedonian footballers
Albanian footballers
FK Napredok players
FK Vëllazërimi 77 players
KF Bylis Ballsh players
FK Metalurg Skopje players
Pembroke Athleta F.C. players
FC Torpedo-BelAZ Zhodino players
KF Shkëndija players
FK Mash'al Mubarek players
FK Mladost Doboj Kakanj players
FC SKA-Khabarovsk players
Pittsburgh Riverhounds SC players
FK Rudar Prijedor players
Macedonian First Football League players
Kategoria Superiore players
Maltese Premier League players
Belarusian Premier League players
Premier League of Bosnia and Herzegovina players
Russian First League players
Macedonian expatriate footballers
Expatriate footballers in Albania
Macedonian expatriate sportspeople in Albania
Expatriate footballers in Malta
Macedonian expatriate sportspeople in Malta
Expatriate footballers in Belarus
Macedonian expatriate sportspeople in Belarus
Expatriate footballers in Uzbekistan
Macedonian expatriate sportspeople in Uzbekistan
Expatriate footballers in Bosnia and Herzegovina
Macedonian expatriate sportspeople in Bosnia and Herzegovina
Expatriate footballers in Russia
Expatriate soccer players in the United States
Macedonian expatriate sportspeople in the United States